is a former Japanese football player and manager. He managed the Japan national team.

Playing career
Kamo was born in Ashiya on October 29, 1939. After graduation from Kwansei Gakuin University, he played for Yanmar Diesel from 1965 to 1967.

Coaching career
In 1974, Kamo became manager for Nissan Motors. In 1991, he became manager for All Nippon Airways (later, Yokohama Flügels) and won the 1993 Emperor's Cup. In December 1994, he was named the Japan national team manager, replacing Paulo Roberto Falcão. After four games at the 1998 World Cup qualification Final round in October 1997, he was dismissed and assistant coach Takeshi Okada was promoted to manager.

In 1999, Kamo became manager for Kyoto Purple Sanga until June 2000. Starting in 2001, he managed a number of universities such as Shobi University, Osaka Gakuin University, and his alma mater Kwansei Gakuin University. In 2017, he was selected for the Japan Football Hall of Fame.

Managerial statistics

References

External links

Japan Football Hall of Fame at Japan Football Association
Profile  at sskamo.co.jp

1939 births
Living people
Kwansei Gakuin University alumni
Association football people from Hyōgo Prefecture
Japanese footballers
Japan Soccer League players
Cerezo Osaka players
Japanese football managers
Japan national football team managers
J1 League managers
Yokohama Flügels managers
Kyoto Sanga FC managers
1995 King Fahd Cup managers
1996 AFC Asian Cup managers
Association football forwards